Ivica Bančić (born 29 October 1971) is a retired Croatian football player who played for both Croatian and lower league German clubs.

External links
  at HRnogomet.
  at Fussballdaten

1971 births
Living people
Footballers from Split, Croatia
Association football defenders
Yugoslav footballers
Croatian footballers
RNK Split players
NK Varaždin players
1. FC Lokomotive Leipzig players
VFC Plauen players
FC Rot-Weiß Erfurt players
Croatian Football League players
Regionalliga players
Croatian expatriate footballers
Expatriate footballers in Germany
Croatian expatriate sportspeople in Germany